HAI or Hai may refer to:

Films 
Hai, a romance film released by Telugu film in 2002
Hai, a romance film released by Kannada film in 2017

People

Surname 
 Hai, a variant on the Chinese Xǔ (surname) (許/许)
 Hǎi, a Chinese surname (海)
 Hoàng Hải (born 1982), Vietnamese singer
 Thanh Hải (1930–1980), Vietnamese poet

Given name 
 Hai Gaon (939–1038), Jewish theologian, rabbi and scholar 
 Yu Hai (born 1987), Chinese footballer
 Hai Lam (footballer), Norwegian footballer
 Hai Du Lam, American League of Legends player

Places 
 Hai, Lviv Oblast, a village in Ukraine
 Hai, a village in Boiany Commune, Novoselytsia Raion, Ukraine
 Hai District, Tanzania
 Hai River, China
 Haiti, IOC and UNDP code HAI

Technology 
 Hai (midget submarine), a German submarine from World War II
 Hai (keelboat), a sloop-rigged one-design yacht class
 Hellenic Aerospace Industry
 Helicopter Association International
 Hemagglutination inhibition assay

Other uses 
 Haï, a book by Jean-Marie Gustave Le Clézio
 Hái!, a 2003 album by The Creatures
 Hai (Cantonese profanity)
 Hai (symbol) or chai, letters of the Hebrew alphabet
 Hai! (Live in Japan), a 1982 album by Cabaret Voltaire
 Hai dialect, of West Kilimanjaro language
 Health Action International,  non-profit organization based in The Netherlands
 Heterosexual Anal Intercourse, see Anal sex
 Hospital-acquired infection
 Humanist Association of Ireland
 Wolfpack Hai, a wolfpack of German U-boats during World War II
Half as Interesting, a YouTube channel hosted by Sam Denby

See also
Hailuoto
Jai (disambiguation)